The St. Thomas Elgins were an independent, minor league baseball team of the semi-professional Intercounty Baseball League based in St. Thomas, Ontario, Canada. They began play as the St. Thomas Legion in 1948 and were renamed the Elgins in 1953; the team disappeared in 1961 and re-emerged as few years after and lasted until 1996. The team was folded in 1996 and were replaced by the Storm in 2000.

Championships
Intercounty League

 1926
 1954
 1955
 1958
 1984

References
 London Free Press
 At the Plate

Intercounty Baseball League
St. Thomas, Ontario
Defunct baseball teams in Canada
Baseball teams in Ontario
Baseball teams established in 1948
1948 establishments in Ontario
1996 disestablishments in Ontario
Sports clubs disestablished in 1996